Yavuz Selekman (15 February 1937 – 18 March 2004) was a Turkish wrestler and film actor. He competed in the men's Greco-Roman middleweight at the 1964 Summer Olympics.

References

External links
 

1937 births
2004 deaths
Turkish male sport wrestlers
Olympic wrestlers of Turkey
Wrestlers at the 1964 Summer Olympics
Place of birth missing
Turkish male film actors
Competitors at the 1963 Mediterranean Games
Mediterranean Games competitors for Turkey
20th-century Turkish people
21st-century Turkish people
World Wrestling Championships medalists